Yanny or Laurel is an auditory illusion which became popular in May 2018, in which a short audio recording of speech can be heard as one of two words. 53 percent of over 500,000 respondents to a Twitter poll reported hearing a man saying the word "Laurel", while 47 percent reported hearing a voice saying the name "Yanny". Analysis of the sound frequencies has confirmed that both sets of sounds are present in the mixed recording, but some users focus on the higher frequency sounds in "Yanny" and cannot seem to hear the lower sounds of the word "Laurel". When the audio clip is slowed to lower frequencies, the word "Yanny" is heard by more listeners, while faster playback loudens "Laurel".

Background
The mixed re-recording was created by students who played the sound of the word "laurel" while re-recording the playback amid background noise in the room.
The audio clip of the main word "laurel" originated in 2007 from a recording of opera singer Jay Aubrey Jones, who spoke the word "laurel" as one of 200,000 reference pronunciations produced and published by vocabulary.com in 2007. The clip was made at Jones' home using a laptop and microphone, with acoustic foam to soundproof the recording. The discovery of the ambiguity phenomenon is attributed to Katie Hetzel, a 15-year-old freshman at Flowery Branch High School in Flowery Branch, Georgia, who posted a description publicly on Instagram on May 11, 2018. The illusion reached further popularity the next day when Hetzel's friend posted it on Reddit, where it was picked up by YouTuber Cloe Feldman, who subsequently posted about it on her Twitter account.

Pop culture
Notable individuals who responded to the auditory illusion included Ellen DeGeneres, Stephen King, and Chrissy Teigen. Laurel Halo and Yanni, whose names are similar to those given in the auditory illusion, also responded. In a video released by the White House, various members of the Trump administration reacted to the meme, and President Donald Trump said, "I hear covfefe", as a reference to his "covfefe" tweet the previous year.

In The Guardian, the clip was compared to the 2015 gold/blue dress controversy. Several days after the clip became popular, the team at Vocabulary.com added a separate entry for the word "Yanny", which contained an audio clip identical to "Laurel". Its definition is about the Internet trend.

Scientific analysis
On May 16, 2018, a report in The New York Times noted a spectrogram analysis confirmed how the extra sounds for "yanny" can be graphed in the mixed re-recording. The sounds were also simulated by combining syllables of the same Vocabulary.com voice saying the words "Yangtze" and "uncanny" as a mash-up of sounds which gave a similar spectrogram as the extra sounds graphed in the laurel re-recording.

Benjamin Munson, a professor of audiology at the University of Minnesota, suggested that "Yanny" can be heard in higher frequencies while "Laurel" can be heard in lower frequencies. Older people, whose ability to hear higher frequencies is more likely to have degraded, usually hear "Laurel". Kevin Franck, the director of audiology at the Boston hospital Massachusetts Eye and Ear says that the clip exists on a "perceptual boundary" and compared it to the Necker Cube illusion. Professor David Alais from the University of Sydney's school of psychology also compared the clip to the Necker Cube or the face/vase illusion, calling it a "perceptually ambiguous stimulus". Brad Story, a professor of speech, language, and audiology at the University of Arizona said that the low quality of the recording creates ambiguity. Dr. Hans Rutger Bosker, psycholinguist and phonetician at the Max Planck Institute for Psycholinguistics, showed that it is possible to make the same person hear the same audio clip differently by presenting it in different acoustic contexts: if one hears the ambiguous audio clip after a lead-in sentence without any high frequencies (>1000 Hz), this makes the higher frequencies in the following ambiguous audio clip stand out more, making people report "Yanny" where they previously maybe heard "Laurel".

Pitch-shifted versions 

By pitch shifting the original audio to higher or lower frequencies, the same listener can report different interpretations. The New York Times released an interactive tool on their website that changes the pitch of the recording in real-time. The interactive slider allows the recording to be played back at any pitch between 3 semitones higher (to help the listener hear "Laurel"), and 6 semitones lower (to help the listener hear "Yanny").

Similar illusions 
In May 2018, a similar viral story grew around a video review of a children's toy from the Ben 10 franchise, where the toy's electronic speech could be heard as either the character's name of "Brainstorm", or the phrase "green needle", depending on which phrase the listener was primed to expect. Others have also reported hearing "green storm" or "brain needle".

The illusion was attributed to the poor quality of the toy's audio recording. Valerie Hazan, a professor of speech sciences at University College London, said of the video that "When faced with an acoustic signal which is somewhat ambiguous because it is low-quality or noisy, your brain attempts a 'best fit' between what is heard and the expected word."

See also

 List of Internet phenomena
 Auditory illusion
 Malapropism
 McGurk effect
 Mondegreen

References

External links
Vocabulary.com definition for "yanny"

2007 works
2018 in science
Auditory illusions
Internet memes introduced in 2018
May 2018 events